Ivo Van Damme (21 February 1954 – 29 December 1976) was a Belgian middle-distance runner.

Van Damme played football until he was 16, but then switched to athletics. His breakthrough came in 1973, when he placed fourth in the 800 m at the European Junior Championships.

He suffered from mononucleosis the following season, but returned strong beating Roger Moens's 1955  national 800 m record. In 1976, he won the European indoor title over this distance, and was one of the favourites for a medal at the 1976 Summer Olympics in Montreal. He eventually ended up second in both the 800 and 1500 m, finishing behind Alberto Juantorena and John Walker, respectively.

These were his last successes, as Van Damme was killed in a car accident later that year while travelling home from Marseille in southern France. He was to marry Rita Thijs in 1977. Since 1977, a memorial competition has been held in Brussels to remember him, the Memorial Van Damme, which is now the championship final for selected disciplines of the Diamond League athletics tour.

References

External links 
 Official Website Memorial van Damme
 
 

1954 births
1976 deaths
People from Dendermonde
Belgian male middle-distance runners
Olympic athletes of Belgium
Athletes (track and field) at the 1976 Summer Olympics
Road incident deaths in France
Sportspeople from East Flanders
Medalists at the 1976 Summer Olympics
Olympic silver medalists for Belgium
Olympic silver medalists in athletics (track and field)